News of the World is a 2020 American Western film co-written and directed by Paul Greengrass, based on the 2016 novel of the same name by Paulette Jiles, and starring Tom Hanks and Helena Zengel. The film follows an aging Civil War veteran who must return a young girl who was taken in by the Kiowa, and raised as one of them, to her last remaining family. She has lost both her birth and Kiowa families.

News of the World was released theatrically by Universal Pictures in the United States on December 25, 2020, and on DirecTV, and grossed $12 million. Internationally, the film was released by Netflix in other territories on February 10, 2021. It received positive reviews from critics who praised Hanks and Zengel's performances as well as the cinematography, musical score, and Greengrass's direction. At the 93rd Academy Awards, the film received nominations for Best Original Score, Best Cinematography, Best Production Design, and Best Sound. Zengel received nominations for Best Supporting Actress at the Golden Globes and Screen Actors Guild Awards.

Plot
In 1870, Captain Jefferson Kyle Kidd, a former Confederate officer who served in the 3rd Texas Infantry, makes a meager living traveling from town to town in Texas and reading newspaper stories to local residents for an admission fee of ten cents. After departing Wichita Falls, Kidd comes across an overturned wagon on the road and finds the driver, a black freedman, had been lynched. He also finds a young white girl who calls herself Cicada and speaks Kiowa. Kidd learns from the girl's paperwork that she is Johanna Leonberger, who had been kidnapped and adopted by Kiowa six years earlier. Union Army troops discovered Johanna while dispersing a Kiowa camp and she was being taken to her living aunt and uncle by the freedman. A passing Union Army patrol instructs Kidd to take the girl to Union officials at an outpost in a town up the road. Kidd has little choice but to acquiesce.

At the town, Kidd is informed that the outpost's Bureau of Indian Affairs representative will be unavailable for three months. Kidd initially plans to leave Johanna in the care of friends Simon and Doris Boudlin, but accepts responsibility for returning the girl to her family in Castroville, some 400 miles away, after she recklessly tries to run away with a band of traveling Native Americans during a storm. In Dallas, Kidd stops at a local inn run by Ella Gannett, an intimate old acquaintance who speaks Kiowa and learns that Johanna's adoptive Native American family was also killed, making her "an orphan twice-over." After reading the news the next night, Kidd and Johanna are accosted by three ex-Confederate soldiers who want to purchase Johanna from him. Kidd refuses and flees with the girl, but the men pursue him into the wilderness. Despite being outgunned, Kidd is able to kill the men after Johanna points out that the dimes Kidd earned from his work could be used as makeshift ammunition for his shotgun.

On the border of Erath County, Kidd and Johanna are detained by militiamen led by Farley, a racist cattle baron who took over the county and had all non-white residents violently expelled. Farley coerces Kidd into reading propaganda that glorifies him to his workers, but Kidd instead reads a story about a disaster in a Pennsylvania coal mine that whips Farley's workers into a rebellious fury. Kidd and Johanna make a run for it in the ensuing melee, but are surrounded by Farley and his men. Just as Farley is about to shoot Kidd, Johanna wounds Farley with Kidd's shotgun, and John Calley, one of Farley's henchmen who was inspired by Kidd's words, deals with the other henchmen and kills Farley.

As the pair continue their journey, their wagon is wrecked and their horses fatally injured when Kidd loses control on a steep road. Kidd and Johanna proceed on foot. After enduring the heat and a blinding sandstorm, they encounter a traveling group of Kiowa who give Johanna a horse. Saved by that gift, Kidd and Johanna eventually reach the Leonberger farmstead. Kidd reluctantly leaves Johanna with her aunt and uncle. He then continues to San Antonio to visit the grave of his wife Maria, who had died of cholera years ago while he was away serving in the Army, for the first time. As he bids farewell to Maria, Kidd realizes that Johanna had become family to him, and rides back to her and apologizes for leaving her behind. Johanna's aunt and uncle, though not uncaring, had her tied to a post to prevent Johanna from repeatedly running away.  They permit Johanna to go with Kidd, with whom she is clearly much more happy.  Later, Captain Kidd enthusiastically reads the news to an audience in a large hall with Johanna's assistance, and Kidd introduces her as his daughter, Johanna Kidd.

Cast

In addition, Neil Sandilands and Winsome Brown portray Johanna's uncle and aunt, respectively.

Production
In May 2017, Fox 2000 Pictures bought distribution rights to an adaptation of the Paulette Jiles novel with Luke Davies writing the screenplay and Tom Hanks set to star. In February 2019, Paul Greengrass was announced as director. As a result of the Disney/Fox merger, the film was transferred to Universal Pictures. In August, Helena Zengel, Michael Covino, and Fred Hechinger were added to the cast, and Thomas Francis Murphy joined in September. Filming commenced on September 2, 2019, in Santa Fe, New Mexico and finished in approximately November 2020. Scenes set in towns and in Dallas, Texas were shot at the western sets of the Bonanza Creek Ranch near the ruins of Bonanza City, New Mexico. Some  computer-generated imagery was used to add more buildings.

Kiowa Tribe member Dorothy WhiteHorse coached Zengel in the Kiowa language and other details of Native American life and behavior, while Tribal Chairman Matthew Komalty praised the film's crew for their attention to accuracy.

In November 2020, Netflix bought the international distribution rights to the film (excluding the United States). Helena Zengel dubbed herself in the Italian, German, French and Spanish versions; the dubbing is limited to the lines she spoke in English.

Release
News of the World was theatrically released by Universal Pictures in the United States on December 25, 2020, and on DirecTV, which was followed by a Premium video on demand (PVOD) release in the United States on January 15, 2021. It originally was going to be released by Fox 2000 Pictures. In November 2020, it was announced that Netflix had acquired international distribution rights, except for the United States and China, and released it digitally on its streaming service on February 10, 2021. On March 2, 2021, Universal Pictures Home Entertainment officially announced that the release date for News of the World to physical media, including Blu-ray Disc, 4k Ultra HD Blu-ray Disc, and DVD, would be March 23, 2021. In the United States, the film was released on HBO/HBO Max on September 4, 2021.

Reception

Box office 
In the United States, News of the World, released alongside Wonder Woman 1984, Promising Young Woman, and Pinocchio, was projected to gross around $4 million from 1,900 theaters in its opening weekend. The film made $1.05 million on its first day, and went on to debut to $2.3 million, finishing second at the box office behind Wonder Woman 1984; 70% of the audience was over the age of 35.
The film fell 25% in its second weekend, grossing $1.7 million, then made $1.24 million in its third weekend.

Critical response
The website's critics consensus reads: "News of the World takes a slow but absorbing ride down a comfortingly familiar Western trail, guided by Tom Hanks in peak paternal mode." On Metacritic, it has a weighted average score of 73 out of 100, based on 45 critics, indicating "generally favorable reviews". Audiences polled by CinemaScore gave the film an average grade of "B+" on an A+ to F scale.

Writing for IndieWire, David Ehrlich gave the film a grade of B and said, "If Greengrass' broadly entertaining (if gallingly relevant) film is a bit too soft and spread thin to hit with the emotional force that it could, so much of its simple power is owed to the grounded nature of the director's approach, which allows these desperate characters to feel as if they're trying to escape the very genre that threatens to define them forever."

A.A. Dowd of The A.V. Club gave the film a "B−" and wrote: "Ultimately, News Of The World lives and dies on the presence of its iconic headliner, on the Hanks of it all. That's the most old-fashioned thing about it: It's a true star vehicle, practically a tribute to his enduring appeal. Yet for as comforting as Hanks is in the role, and for as much as he sells the poignancy of the film's bittersweet final stretch, the film feels almost too built around his signature nobility to ever gain much in the way of actual drama."

Mark Kermode of The Observer awarded the film 4 out of 5 stars and wrote, "Having emerged from news documentaries to become a peerless director of vivid real-life dramas (Bloody Sunday, United 93) and frenetically visceral adventures (The Bourne franchise), Greengrass relishes the opportunity to take a more languorous attitude to character development and location, a quality that seems to have confounded some fans of the director’s more urgent fare. Yet I found this a rewarding and entertaining drama, heavy with the weight of the past, yet buoyed up by the possibilities of the future."

Contrasting views display the comments on the movie by Philipp Emberger, the critic of ORF, the Austrian Broadcasting Corporation: under the title "Helena Zengel Overpowering Tom Hanks", he describes her scenes as the highlights of the film, compared to Tom Hanks's solos that seem "arduously one-dimensional", concluding that "Tom Hanks delivers a lot of forgivingness, besides the Dad-vibes", which makes the film "a quiet and steady Western with elements of road-movie, beautiful pictures of landscapes, a relevant topic, lots of heart, and a star named Helena Zengel." Peter Bradshaw of The Guardian gave the film 2 out of 5 stars, writing that although Hanks's "persona here is equable and easy-going, qualities which are of course necessary to his sympathetic brand identity, he doesn’t plausibly change in any dramatic way", and describing the film as a "handsomely shot but stolid and blandly self-satisfied western".

A. O. Scott of The New York Times gave a mixed review, writing that "this isn't a bad movie. The problem is that it's too nice a movie, too careful and compromised, as if its makers didn't trust the audience to handle the real news of the world."

Tom Gliatto of People named it the fifth best film of the year.

Accolades

See also
Olive Oatman

References

External links
 
 
 Script 
 News of Bollywood Upcoming Movies 2021

2020 films
2020 Western (genre) films
American Western (genre) films
English-language Netflix original films
Films based on American novels
Films directed by Paul Greengrass
Films produced by Gary Goetzman
Films scored by James Newton Howard
Films set in 1870
Films shot in New Mexico
Kiowa-language films
Playtone films
Universal Pictures films
2020s American films